Sung-soo, also spelled as Seong-soo, Seong-su, or in North Korea as Song-su, is a Korean masculine given name. The meaning differs based on the hanja used to write each syllable of the name. There are 27 hanja with the reading "sung" and 67 hanja with the reading "soo" on the South Korean government's official list of hanja which may be used in given names. It was the third-most popular name for baby boys in South Korea in 1950, falling to seventh place in 1960.

People with this name include:

Kim Seong-su (1891–1955), Korean independence activist
Kim Sung-su (director) (born 1961), South Korean film director
Doha Kang (born Kang Seong-su, 1969), South Korean manhwa artist
Park Sung-soo (born 1970), South Korean archer 
Kim Sung-soo (actor) (born 1975), South Korean actor
Kim Seong-soo (footballer) (born 1992), South Korean football midfielder (K League 2)
Hwang Song-su (born 1987), Zainichi Korean football midfielder and forward (J1 League)
Eun Seong-soo (born 1993), South Korean football midfielder (K League 1)
Park Seong-su (born 1996), South Korean football goalkeeper (J2 League)

See also
List of Korean given names

References

Korean masculine given names